Akseli Pelvas (born 8 February 1989) is a retired Finnish footballer who played as a striker.

Career

Club
Pelvas got started with football in the age of five, when he joined EsPa in Espoo. In 2003, he joined HJK’s juniors at the age of 14. After just two years, he was promoted to HJK’s reserve side Klubi 04.

Pelvas made his first team debut at the age of 18 in a 1–1 draw against FC Inter Turku on 28 June 2007. He spent most of the 2008 season in the reserves, scoring 24 goals in 17 games.
In the middle of the 2008 season he was on loan at IFK Mariehamn. He scored his first two goals on 19 October 2008 in a 2–3 away victory against FC Haka.

On 22 February 2009, Pelvas signed a three-year deal with HJK. On 16 December 2015, Pelvas signed for the Swedish club Falkenbergs FF. He returned to HJK in August 2016.

After spending the 2020 season back with IFK Mariehamn, Pelvas announced his retirement in September 2021.

Career statistics

International
Pelvas has played for his country in different national junior teams, most recently the Finland national under-21 football team. He has been one of the most effective strikers for Finland's youth teams, together with Lauri Dalla Valle. He made his senior debut for Finland on 22 January 2012, in a friendly against Trinidad and Tobago.

International goals
Scores and results list Finland's goal tally first.

References

External links
 
 Profile at HJK.fi
 Stats at Veikkausliiga.com

1989 births
Living people
Finnish footballers
Finnish expatriate footballers
Finland international footballers
Finland youth international footballers
Finland under-21 international footballers
Association football forwards
Veikkausliiga players
Allsvenskan players
Helsingin Jalkapalloklubi players
Klubi 04 players
Etelä-Espoon Pallo players
IFK Mariehamn players
Falkenbergs FF players
Finnish expatriate sportspeople in Sweden
Expatriate footballers in Sweden
Footballers from Espoo